The 2013 Open de Nice Côte d'Azur was a men's tennis tournament played on outdoor clay courts. It was the 29th edition of the Open de Nice Côte d'Azur and was part of the ATP World Tour 250 series of the 2013 ATP World Tour. It took place at the Nice Lawn Tennis Club in Nice, France, from May 19 through May 25, 2013.

Singles main draw entrants

Seeds 

 Rankings are as of May 13, 2013.

Other entrants 
The following players received wildcards into the singles main draw:
  Lleyton Hewitt
  Gaël Monfils
  Édouard Roger-Vasselin

The following players received entry from the qualifying draw:
  Marco Cecchinato
  Rogério Dutra da Silva
  Guillaume Rufin
  Sergiy Stakhovsky

The following player received entry as a lucky loser:
  Ryan Harrison

The following player received entry as an alternate:
  Albert Montañés

Withdrawals 
Before the tournament
  Brian Baker
  Tomáš Berdych (fatigue)
  Bernard Tomic (personal reasons)
  Marcel Granollers (shoulder injury)
  Xavier Malisse
  Benoît Paire

Retirements 
  Alejandro Falla (right calf injury)

Doubles main draw entrants

Seeds 

 Rankings are as of May 13, 2013.

Other entrants 
The following pairs received wildcards into the doubles main draw:
  Pablo Andújar /  Albert Ramos
  Alexandre Massa /  Alexandre Pierson

The following pair received entry as alternates:
  Jaroslav Levinský /  Lu Yen-hsun

Withdrawals 
Before the tournament
  Alejandro Falla (right calf injury)

Finals

Singles 

 Albert Montañés defeated  Gaël Monfils, 6–0, 7–6(7–3)

Doubles 

  Johan Brunström /  Raven Klaasen defeated  Juan Sebastián Cabal /  Robert Farah, 6–3, 6–2

References

External links 
 Official website